James G. C. Hamilton ( ? ) was an American sculptor active in Cleveland, Ohio from about 1887-1898. According to Artists in Ohio, he was said to be a graduate of the Pennsylvania Academy of the Fine Arts, and according to the Building News and Engineering Journal, he served as an assistant to Alexander Milne Calder for sculptures in the Philadelphia City Hall.  Hamilton was a Freemason as a member of Franklin Ledge #20.

His other notable works include:

 Monument to 1st New York Independent Battery Light Artillery, "Cowan's Battery," 1887, Gettysburg, Pennsylvania
 Gen. Moses Cleaveland, 1888, Public Square, Cleveland, Ohio
 Major John Mason, 1889, Mystic, Connecticut (Statue of John Mason)
 Red Jacket Monument, 1890, Forest Lawn Cemetery, Buffalo, New York 
 Harvey Rice Monument, 1900, Wade Park, Cleveland, Ohio

Hamilton sculpted these works while under contract to the Smith Granite Company of Westerly, Rhode Island.

Works

References

Sources 
 Artists in Ohio, 1787-1900: A Biographical Dictionary, by Jeffrey Weidman, Oberlin College. Library, Kent State University Press, 2000, page 369. 
 The Monumental News, Volume 12, 1900, page 275. 
 The Building News and Engineering Journal, Volume 46, Office for Publication and advertisements, 1884, page 972. 

American sculptors
American Freemasons
Pennsylvania Academy of the Fine Arts alumni
Sculptors from Ohio
Year of birth missing
Year of death missing